Gunhild Margareta Hallin Ekerot (20 February 1931 – 9 February 2020) was a Swedish opera singer, composer and actress.

Early life and debut
Hallin was born on 20 February 1931, in Karlskoga. She made her debut during her time as a student at the University College of Opera in 1955 as Rosina in Rossini's Barberaren i Sevilla.

Career

Hallin joined the Royal Swedish Opera as a full-time employee in 1956, where she performed in roles such as Zerbinetta in Ariadne på Naxos by Richard Strauss, the title role of Donizetti's Lucia di Lammermoor, Sophie in Rosenkavaljeren by Strauss, Leonora in Verdi's Trubaduren, Amelia in Maskeradbalen, the title role in Aida, and Gilda in Rigoletto.  Hallin was appointed Hovsångerska (Royal Court singer) along with Erik Saedén, in 1966, and was awarded the Jussi Björling Scholarship in 1970.  Her last performance at the Opera was in the title role of Cherubini's Médée.

Hallin's voice has been described as a "coloratura soprano". She was considered to have the talent required for the international scene, but she chose to stay in Sweden.

Her opera roles in the 1950s to 1970s included the blind poetess in Karl-Birger Blomdahl's Aniara, Anne Trulove in Stravinsky's The Rake's Progress, the title role in Verdi's La traviata, Therese in Lars Johan Werle's Drömmen om Thérèse, and the Queen Mother in Georg Joseph Vogler's Gustaf Adolf och Ebba Brahe. Hallin also performed in Glyndebourne, Florence, Vienna, Hamburg, Moscow, London and Copenhagen, as well as making a tour in the Soviet Union.

In the mid-1980s, she started composing music. Encouraged by composer Eberhard Eyser, she made her debut in 1986 with poems set to music. The poems were by Nils Ferlin, Harry Martinson, Werner Aspenström and Alf Henrikson – she performed a medley of these in the Drottningholm Palace Church. She was elected as a member of the Swedish Society of Composers in 1990 and was awarded the honorary academic title of Professors namn in 2001. In 2006, she received the Gunn Wållgren Award.

She set several works by August Strindberg to music, beginning with a chamber opera based on Fröken Julie (Miss Julie) in 1990. Miss Julie was staged at the Confidence Theatre in 1990, and restaged in 1994. Hallin also composed music for Strindberg's works Den Starkare (The Stronger One) which was performed in the Rotunda at the Royal Opera in Stockholm in 1991, and Ett drömspel (A Dream Play) in 1992.

In Sundsvall in 2012, Hallin premiered a program, both read and sung, which she had composed based upon Strindberg's letters to Harriet Bosse. At its performance in Kramfors, the production was accompanied by a small exhibition of Hallin's paintings, including a portrait of Strindberg.

Personal life 
Hallin was married twice. Her first marriage was to violinist Inge Boström from 1951 to 1956. The couple had a daughter, born in 1952. Her second marriage was to Bengt Ekerot. Their son was born in 1966.

Hallin died on 9 February 2020, at the age of 88.

Awards and titles 
 1966Hovsångerska (Swedish Court singer)
 1969 – Kvällspostens Thaliapris
 1970 – Jussi Björlingstipendiet
 1972Member No. 769 at the Royal Swedish Academy of Music
 1976Litteris et Artibus
 1981 – Svenska grammofonpriset ("Swedish gramophone prize") for Gullebarn (with Rolf Lindblom, piano)
 2004 – Hugo Alfvénpriset
 2006Gunn Wållgren Award

Roles

Plays 
 1997Shylock, The Merchant of Venice, Säffleoperan
 2007Mumien, Överstens hustru in Strindberg's The Ghost Sonata, Strindbergs Intima Teater
 2011Sjuksköterskan in Strindberg's Taklagsöl ("Topping out Ceremony"), Strindbergs Intima Teater

Discography 
 Sex kvinnoporträtt ur operans värld ("Six portraits of women from the opera world"), solo performance with Norrköpings symfoniorkester, EMI HMV 4E 061-34616.
 Great Swedish Singers. Bluebell ABCD 060.
 Svenska hovsångerskor ("Swedish choir of court singers"). EMI CMCD 6350. Svensk mediedatabas.
 Lieder. Strauss, Mahler, Mozart. Margareta Hallin. Rolf Lindblom, piano. Proprius PRCD 9151. Svensk mediedatabas.
 Rigoletto as Gilda in Verdi's opera. Live recording. BIS CD-296. (2 CDs).
 Tranfjädrarna ("The Twilight Crane") as Tsu in Sven-Erik Bäck's opera. Norrköpings symfoniorkester. with Olle Sivall, Uno Ebréus. Kammarkören, cond. Eric Ericson. Swedish Society Disciofil. SLT 33183. Grammis Award.

See also

References

Notes

Citations

Sources

Further reading

External links 

1931 births
2020 deaths
20th-century Swedish actresses
21st-century Swedish actresses
Litteris et Artibus recipients
People from Karlskoga Municipality
Swedish women composers
Swedish film actresses
Swedish musical theatre actresses
Swedish musical theatre composers
Swedish operatic sopranos
20th-century Swedish women opera  singers
21st-century Swedish women  opera singers